OFB 105mm SPG is an Indian self-propelled tracked artillery. It has been Developed & Manufactured by Ordnance development centre, Ordnance Factory Medak.

Design
The weapon is based on Sarath's (License produced variant of Russian BMP-2) hull mounted with Indian towed 105 mm Light field Gun (LFG).  The system can stow 42 rounds of ammunition. The artillery can be used to destroy enemy fortification and also in anti tank role. The Original sights of 105 mm LFG have been retained. A GPS have been provided for navigation. The turret provides level-3 protection for the crew. It was first displayed in  February 2010 during DEFEXPO-2010 in New Delhi and it is planned to replace the FV433 Abbot SPG in the Indian army. 
There is option of composite armour turret to increase protection of crew against 12.7mm weapon. An autoloader along with Fire control system can also be provided to achieve Multiple Rounds Simultaneous Impact. TALIN 500 Inertial Navigation System can also be installed to navigate in regions where GPS is unavailable due to terrain masking or enemy jamming. ammunition  carrying capacity can also be increased to 92 rounds.

Specifications
 Caliber: 105mm
 Maximum firing range: 19 km
 Rate of fire: 4 Normal, 6 Intense
 Weight: 16 tonnes
 Range of elevation: -5 to 70 degrees
 Traverse : 360 degrees
 Number of crew: 5
 Time in and out of action: 1 minute
 Ammunition: HE, HEAT, HESH, APDS, smoke, colour
 Ammunition capacity : 42 rounds
 Type of vehicle : Fully tracked, armoured, air portable
 Mobility : 65 kmph
 Sight: 104A Indirect, 106A Direct.

References

External links
 OFB product data
 Image 1
 Image 2

Military vehicles of India
Artillery of India